Barry Aron Vann (born March 30, 1960) is an author, speaker and retired Dean of Behavioral and Social Sciences at Colorado Christian University. A prolific writer, Vann has published on a wide range of geographic topics. He is most noted for his work in environmental perceptions and religious geography, in particular themes in which religious beliefs are associated with forming environmental perceptions and politicized regions such as Northern Ireland and the American Bible Belt. Vann's work along the interface between religion and geography stresses the role of faith leaders in shaping the behaviours of others who in turn impact the cultural landscape. An excellent description of how Vann conjoins geotheology and leadership, or the lack thereof, is expressed by Andrew Nicholls in The Journal of British Studies: “Vann acknowledges that the early Stuart policy of plantation facilitated the emigration of Scots to Ireland, and for those who feared and loathed the religious policies of the regime, early seventeenth century Ulster [nine northern counties in Ireland] could stand as a land of refuge.   But only for some.  Scotland featured numerous socioeconomic challenges, and for some dissenters, rising rents, unproductive lands, and failed crops were evidence of punishment from an angry God. Therefore, migration became an opportunity to atone for one's sins as well, although individuals leaving Scotland owing to poverty could expect little sympathy from their religious leaders." His book Puritan Islam: The Geoexpansion of the Muslim World was chosen as a Top 25 Outstanding Academic Title for 2012 by Choice, a division of the American Library Association (ALA). A review in the April 2012 issue of Choice referred to Puritan Islam as "perhaps the best geographical text produced on this subject since 2000" and of "utmost significance in finally taking the topic away from the emotional to where it needs to be—rational and explanatory discussion." On her show Spirited Debate, Lauren Green of Fox News called Puritan Islam a "fascinating book."

Professor Vann's other important academic works include Rediscovering the South's Celtic Heritage; In Search of Ulster-Scots Land: The Birth and Geotheological Imaginings of a Transatlantic People;  Geography Toward History: Studies in the Mediterranean Basin and Mesopotamia (with Ellsworth Huntington); The Forces of Nature: Our Quest to Conquer the Planet and Presbyterian Social Ties and Mobility in the Irish Sea Culture Area, 1610–1690. Climate Change in History: A Geotheological Perspective (2020) uses biblical and qur'anic narratives and paleoclimatological studies to help establish dates for those respective writings.  Narratives in the sacred texts also highlight how ancient people understood weather and climate and help modern scholars see how much climate has changed over a 3800-year span of time.

Professor Vann has been a guest on a number of radio and television shows, including BBC Scotland; Fox News Channel's "Spirited Debate" with Lauren Green; Ecotopia with Susan and Stephen Tchudi;"Science Fantastic" with Professor Michio Kaku; the "Mancow Experience"; "Point of Inquiry" with Josh Zepps; BBC Two; Northern Visions TV in Belfast, Northern Ireland; and PBS-"Tennessee Life." His articles and reviews have appeared in the Huffington Post; the Journal of Transatlantic Studies; the Journal of American History; Geography of Religions and Belief Systems; the Journal of Historical Sociology; Human Resource Development Quarterly; and the SBS (Swiss Business School) Journal of Applied Business Research, among others.
   
The conceptual framework Vann uses to analyse the relationship between belief systems and spaces, including nations and towns is called geotheology (the general relationship between the worship of the divine and spaces, including nations).  Geotheology is a concept conceived by geographer John Kirtland Wright (1891–1969).   Recognizing the limits of Wright’s taxonomy in describing how people view the forces of nature as mechanisms through which divine agents deliver punishments and rewards on wayward or deserving people, Vann added geotheomisthosis (earth, God, reward) and geotheokolasis (“earth, God, punishment”). To capture the ways in which secular people see human environmental interactions, Vann coined geokolasis (earth punishes) and geomisthosis (earth rewards). In addition to work in the area of geotheology, Vann has also contributed insights into the interface between history and geography, as well as issues related to overpopulation and environmental hazards. 
 
Vann obtained his Ph.D. in Historical Geography, dually awarded by the faculties of Church History and Earth and Geographical Sciences, from the University of Glasgow and also holds a Doctor of Education (Ed.D.) in adult education with a focus in community development from the University of Arkansas. He received an M.S. in Geography from Western Kentucky University and a B.S. in Social Sciences from Tennessee Technological University. He also received an A.S. from Roane State Community College and was selected for their 2012 Outstanding Alumni award. Although a distant relative of Cherokee Chief James Vann and comedian Will Rogers, Professor Vann’s early life was typical of poor families living in southern Appalachia in the mid-twentieth century. He was born Barry Walker, son of a single mother, in Clinton, Tennessee, on 30 March 1960.  The home in which his family lived did not have plumbing, and heat was provided by wood fuel or coal burned in a stove. His parents were Dorothy A. Voyles (b. 1935) and Harry Mack Vann Jr. (1935–2010), but he was raised by Rufus (1912–1995) and Vernedith Voyles (1919–1999), his maternal grandparents. Vann did, however, live at times with his mother, stepfather, and four siblings in Detroit, Michigan. According to Vann in an interview on “Science Fantastic” in 2012, it was his childhood experiences travelling to and from his mother’s neighbourhood in Detroit that inspired him to become a geographer. At age 14, Vann sought out his birth father and, with his consent, took his surname at age 20. Professor Vann and his wife Amy have two children, Sarah and Preston.

Notes

1960 births
Living people
American geographers
University of the Cumberlands people
Alumni of the University of Glasgow
University of Arkansas alumni
Western Kentucky University alumni
Tennessee Technological University alumni